Valmiki Ashram is a Hindu Balmiki temple situated in Chitwan district of Nepal, inside Chitwan National Park. It is close to the Triveni Dham where Tamasa, Sona and Sapta Gandaki rivers meet. Deities worshipped here include Rama, Sita, and Valmiki. The festival of Rama Navami is also celebrated here.

According to Hindu mythology, it is the place where Rishi Valmiki lived and wrote the hindu epic Ramayana. It is believed that Sita, consort of lord Rama, came here to stay during pregnancy and it was the place where Lava and Kusha were born.

The temple is accessible by crossing the Triveni river and then by walking or taking a vehicle across the border via the nearby Gandaki barrage.

See also
Ayodhyapuri
Triveni Dham
Janakpur Dham

References

Hindu temples in Bagmati Province
Buildings and structures in Chitwan District